= Ammoora =

Restaurant in Baltimore, Maryland, U.S.

- Interactive map of Ammoora

Restaurant information
- Food type: Syrian cuisine
- Location: 751 Key Highway, Baltimore, Maryland, 21230, United States
- Coordinates: 39°16′52″N 76°36′24″W
- Website: ammoora.com

Ammoora is a restaurant in Baltimore, Maryland. It was included in The New York Times's 2024 list of the 50 best restaurants in the United States.
